Construction morphology (CM) or construction-dependent morphology is a morphological theory aimed at a better understanding of the grammar of words, as well as the relation between syntax, morphology, and the lexicon. It was introduced by Geert Booij in 2000s.

References

External links
Bibliography of Construction Morphology

Further reading
 Geert Booij, Construction Morphology. Oxford: Oxford University Press, 2010

Linguistic morphology
Linguistic theories and hypotheses